Alicia Bridges is the eponymous debut album from disco singer-songwriter Alicia Bridges, released in 1978 on Polydor Records. The album featured the smash hit single, "I Love the Nightlife (Disco Round)", which, when released as a 12" single (as remixed by producer Jim Burgess), reached a peak of number 5 on the Billboard, Cash Box & Record World charts in 1978 (quickly becoming an RIAA-certified gold record for sales of over one million copies; it would now be seen as a platinum record). Alicia Bridges peaked a number 52 on the Australian chart.

Bridges released a second single shortly thereafter; the rock-inflected "Body Heat", which had the same strong backbeat as her big hit, but also featured more prominent rhythm guitar.  The song became a minor hit, but it was the success of the first single that drove the album, which climbed the charts quickly and remained there for a total of 35 weeks.  Bridges would be nominated for a Grammy and performed the hit single as an opening act.

Track listing
All songs written by Alicia Bridges and Susan Hutcheson, except where noted.
"Body Heat" – 3:02
"Break Away" – 3:27
"High Altitudes" – 5:01
"We Are One" – 4:20
"City Rhythm" – 3:38
"I Love the Nightlife (Disco 'Round)" – 5:37
"In the Name of Love" (Alicia Bridges) – 4:07
"Self Applause" – 3:22
"Diamond in the Rough" – 3:28
"Broken Woman" (Alicia Bridges) – 4:20

Personnel
Alicia Bridges - lead and backing vocal
Bernardine Mitchell, Keith "Doc" Samuels, Vinni O'Neal - backing vocals
Steve Buckingham, Ken Bell - guitars
John Fristoe - guitars, backing vocals
Randy McCormick - organ, piano, synthesizers, clavinet, melodica, string arrangements
Alan Feingold, Steve McRay - organ
Tom Robb - bass
Roy Yeager - drums
Mickey Buckins - percussion
Jay Scott - saxophone

Production
Produced by Steve Buckingham for The Lowery Group
Engineered by Pete Turbiville
Mix & re-mixed Milan Bogdan, Pete Turbiville, Rodney Mills & Tad Bush
Mastered by Bob Ludwig
Rick Diamond - sleeve photography

References

1978 debut albums
Polydor Records albums
Albums produced by Steve Buckingham (record producer)
Alicia Bridges albums